Salli Elise Richardson-Whitfield is an American actress, director and producer. Richardson is known for her role as Angela in the film A Low Down Dirty Shame (1994) and for her role as Dr. Allison Blake on the Syfy comedy-drama series Eureka (2006–2012).

She is also known for her voice acting as Elisa Maza on the Disney animated series Gargoyles (1994–1996), and as Viveca Foster on the CBS series Family Law (1999-2002). Richardson also has appeared in a number of other films such as The Great White Hype (1996), Antwone Fisher (2002), Anacondas: The Hunt for the Blood Orchid (2004) and I Am Legend (2007). She had leading roles in the independent films Pastor Brown (2009), Black Dynamite (2009) and I Will Follow (2010). In the 2010s, Richardson started working as a television director.

Early life
Richardson was born in Chicago, Illinois. Her mother is of African American ancestry (with distant Cherokee roots), and her father was of English and Italian descent. She played tennis in high school at the University of Chicago Laboratory Schools, and launched her acting career in the Kuumba Workshop theater there; she graduated in 1985.

Career

Acting
Richardson "began her acting career in the theater before transitioning to roles in television and film". In film, she played small roles in Prelude to a Kiss, Mo' Money, Posse, and later had major roles in Sioux City and A Low Down Dirty Shame. From 1994 to 1996 she voiced the character Elisa Maza on the animated series Gargoyles. She had many guest-starring roles in numerous television shows, such as Star Trek: Deep Space Nine, New York Undercover, The Pretender, Stargate SG-1, NYPD Blue, House, Bones, Criminal Minds, NCIS and Castle.

Richardson starred opposite Dixie Carter and Kathleen Quinlan in the CBS legal drama series, Family Law, from 1999 to 2002. She had recurring roles as Nancy Adams on Rude Awakening, and as Laura on CSI: Miami. She starred opposite Denzel Washington in the 2002 drama film Antwone Fisher. She also appeared in the 2004 horror film Anacondas: The Hunt for the Blood Orchid, and starred opposite Will Smith in 2007's post-apocalyptic film I Am Legend. She later had a leading role in the independent dramas Pastor Brown (2009), and in I Will Follow (2010) directed by Ava DuVernay. She also starred in The Sin Seer with Isaiah Washington, set for 2015 release.

From 2006 to 2012, Richardson starred as Department of Defense agent (and later head of Global Dynamics) Allison Blake in the Syfy comedy-drama series Eureka. Her second pregnancy was written into the storyline of the series. After the series' cancellation, she was cast as the lead in the Lifetime drama pilot The Secret Lives of Wives. In 2014, Richardson was cast in a recurring role on Lifetime's The Lottery as the first lady of the United States, but she lost it to Shelley Conn; She also has a role on BET's Being Mary Jane as an old friend of the lead character. In 2015, Richardson was cast in the ABC Family series, Stitchers. The series was canceled after three seasons in 2017.

Directing
Richardson has also worked as a director of episodic television, her latest being episodes 5 and 6 of the first season of Wheel of Time for Amazon. Following her directorial debut on two episodes of her show Eureka, in 2016 she directed two episodes of Ava DuVernay's drama series for Oprah Winfrey Network, Queen Sugar (on which her husband Dondre Whitfield appears as a series regular). In 2016, Richardson also directed an episode of the historical action-drama Underground for WGN America. In 2017, she directed two episodes of BET drama Rebel, and Shonda Rhimes' Scandal. Her comedy directing credits include Survivor's Remorse, I'm Dying Up Here, Black-ish and Dear White People. In 2018, she also directed the 16th episode of Agents of S.H.I.E.L.D.s fifth-season episode "Inside Voices". Her other notable directing credits include Chicago Med, Luke Cage, Black Lightning, The Punisher, American Gods, See and Altered Carbon.

In 2019, Richardson received an NAACP Image Award for Outstanding Directing in a Drama Series nomination for her work directing Luke Cage. Also in 2019, she won a Black Reel Award for Outstanding Directing in a Comedy Series for directing Black-ish. In September 2020, she signed a project development deal with HBO. Richardson produces and had had directed episodes of HBO period drama The Gilded Age and Adam McKay's untitled Lakers project. Also in 2020, she directed the Zoom Where It Happens special The One with the Diverse Cast, a Friends one-night reboot starring Sterling K. Brown, Uzo Aduba, Ryan Michelle Bathe, Aisha Hinds, Kendrick Sampson and Jeremy Pope.

Personal life
On September 8, 2002, she married long-time boyfriend and fellow actor Dondre Whitfield. She and Whitfield have one daughter and one son.

Filmography

Film

Television

Directing

Awards and nominations

References

External links

 
 
 

20th-century American actresses
21st-century American actresses
Actresses from Chicago
African-American actresses
American film actresses
American television actresses
American people of English descent
American people of Italian descent
American people who self-identify as being of Native American descent
American voice actresses
Living people
University of Chicago Laboratory Schools alumni
American women television directors
American television directors
20th-century African-American women
20th-century African-American people
21st-century African-American women
21st-century African-American people
Year of birth missing (living people)